The Germany women's national water polo team represents Germany in international women's water polo competitions and friendly matches.

Results
All results before 1990 are for the West German team.

World Championship

1986 – 6th place
1991 – 6th place
1994 – 8th place
2003 – 10th place
2005 – 8th place
2007 – 11th place
2009 – 10th place

World League
2012 – 6th place

European Championship

1985 –  Bronze medal
1987 – 4th place
1989 – 5th place
1991 – 6th place
1993 – 6th place
1995 – 7th place
1997 – 6th place
1999 – 7th place
2001 – 7th place
2003 – 7th place
2006 – 7th place
2008 – 7th place
2010 – 7th place
2012 – 8th place
2016 – 8th place
2018 – 8th place
2020 – 11th place
2022 – 10th place

Current squad
Roster for the 2020 Women's European Water Polo Championship.

Head coach: Arno Troost

Under-20 team
Germany lastly competed at the 2021 FINA Junior Water Polo World Championships.

References

External links

Women's national water polo teams
W